Deep Impact (Japanese : ディープインパクト, March 25, 2002 – July 30, 2019) was a champion Japanese Thoroughbred racehorse who won the Japanese Triple Crown in 2005 and the Japan Cup in 2006, as well as three other Japan Grade One races.

Background
Deep Impact's sire Sunday Silence took over from perennial Japanese leading sire Northern Taste (10 time leading sire in Japan) and was leading sire in Japan 12 times. His dam, Wind In Her Hair, a Group One winner, finished second in The Oaks to super-filly Balanchine and was out of Burghclere, a daughter of dual-Classic winner Highclere, who was owned and bred by Queen Elizabeth II. Burghclere in turn was a three-quarters sister to top filly Height Of Fashion, sold by the Queen to Hamdan bin Rashid Al Maktoum, and subsequently the dam of Epsom Derby winner Nashwan, leading sire Unfuwain and multiple Group One winner Nayef.

Racing career

2005: Three-Year-Old Season
Deep Impact won over Admire Japan by two lengths in Kikuka Sho on 23 October 2005, thereby becoming the first horse since Narita Brian 11 years earlier to complete the Japanese Triple crown. He also became the first unbeaten Japanese Triple crown winner since Symboli Rudolf 21 years earlier, but in his next race, Arima Kinen, Deep Impact was defeated by Heart's Cry to suffer his first loss in his racing career.

2006: Four-Year-Old Season
In 2006, Deep Impact returned to the turf with an easy victory in the Grade 2 Hanshin Daishōten.

Then he won the spring Tenno Sho, setting a new world record for a 3200-meter race in the time of (3'13"4)

He followed up with a victory in the Grade 1 Takarazuka Kinen over 2200m.

In October, he raced in France's most prestigious race, the Group 1 Prix de l'Arc de Triomphe over 2400m. He was heavy favourite for the race, and 1,587,263 € (about $1,238,000) was bet on him in France (especially by many of the Japanese fans that traveled to the racecourse). However he only finished third.

Two weeks later, news from France Galop revealed Deep Impact was positive tested to Ipratropium. Connections announced the colt would retire to stud after that season in a syndication deal worth 5.1 billion yen.

Deep Impact then won the Japan Cup and Arima Kinen before being retired for stud.

Wins:
 2005 Hochi Hai Yayoi Sho (Domestic G2), Nakayama Turf 2000m
 2005 Satsuki Sho (Japanese 2000 Guineas) (Domestic G1), Nakayama Turf 2000m
 2005 Tokyo Yushun (Japanese Derby) (Domestic G1), Tokyo Turf 2400m
 2005 Kobe Shimbun Hai (Domestic G2), Hanshin Turf 2000m
 2005 Kikuka Sho (Japanese St. Leger) (Domestic G1), Kyoto Turf 3000m
 2006 Hanshin Daishoten (G2), Hanshin Turf 3000m
 2006 Tenno Sho (Spring) (Domestic G1), Kyoto Turf 3200m
 2006 Takarazuka Kinen  (G1), Kyoto Turf 2200m
 2006 Japan Cup (G1), Tokyo Turf 2400m
 2006 Arima Kinen (Domestic G1), Nakayama Turf 2500m

Stud record
Deep Impact stood at the Shadai Stallion Station in Abira, Hokkaido, where he became one of the world's most dominant stallions. He was crowned Japanese Champion Sire for nine consecutive years from 2012 to 2020, and sired stars including Gentildonna, Real Steel, and A Shin Hikari. In 2020, his son Contrail completed the Japanese Triple Crown undefeated just like his sire.

In addition, Deep Impact is also the damsire of Kiseki (2017 Kikuka Sho), Blowout (2021 First Lady Stakes), Geraldina (2022 QE II Cup), and Dolce More (2022 Asahi Hai Futurity Stakes).

Notable progeny
c = colt, f = filly

Pedigree

Death

On 30 July 2019, Deep Impact was euthanized after suffering a cervical fracture.  The 2019 Japan Cup was named the Deep Impact Memorial.

See also
 List of historical horses

References

See also

List of leading Thoroughbred racehorses
 St Lite (Japanese first Triple crown in 1941)
 Shinzan (Japanese Triple crown in 1964)
 Mr. C.B. (Japanese Triple crown in 1983)
 Symboli Rudolf (Japanese first undefeated Triple crown in 1984)
 Narita Brian (Japanese Triple crown in 1994)
 Orfevre (Japanese Triple crown in 2011)

2002 racehorse births
2019 racehorse deaths
Japan Cup winners
Japanese Thoroughbred Horse of the Year
Racehorses bred in Japan
Racehorses trained in Japan
Thoroughbred family 2-f
Triple Crown of Thoroughbred Racing winners